Children's Museum of Tacoma is a nonprofit museum for children located in Tacoma, Washington. The museum officially opened in 1986. The museum offers hands on play-to-learn experiences for children. In 2018 the museum secured a 1.6 million dollar commitment from the U.S. Department of Defense to open a satellite location on a military base (Joint Base Lewis-McChord).

History
The museum was established in 1985, and opened in 1986: it features play activities and hands on learning for children. In 2000 Tanya Durand became the Executive director.

In 2012 the museum moved to a larger venue in Tacoma Washington. The museum also began a policy of allowing customers to pay whatever they want to pay for admission. The museum has three separate themes: Woods, Water and Voyager.

The University of Washington Tacoma
In 2015 The University of Washington Tacoma and the Children's Museum of Tacoma opened a learning center called The Muse. The Muse was set up to serve the children of instructors and staff of the university.

Partnership with the U.S. Department of Defense
In 2018 the Children's Museum made plans with the support of the U.S. Department of Defense to open a second museum on the Joint Base Lewis-McChord. The museum is converting a skating rink on the base. The museum is expected to open in 2020. The Department of Defense committed $1.6 million to the project.

In January 2020 it was announced that Boeing and the Employees Community Fund (ECF) of Boeing have donated $1.5-million to the new Children's Museum of Tacoma which will be on the Joint Base Lewis-McChord.

References

External links
Children's Museum of Tacoma

Children's museums in Washington (state)
Museums established in 1985
Museums in Tacoma, Washington
Tourist attractions in Washington (state)
1985 establishments in Washington (state)